Shavian is a Unicode block containing characters of the Shavian alphabet (also known as the Shaw alphabet), an orthography invented to write English phonetically and funded by the will of George Bernard Shaw. The Shavian block was derived from an earlier private use encoding in the ConScript Unicode Registry, like the Deseret and Phaistos Disc encodings.

History
The following Unicode-related documents record the purpose and process of defining specific characters in the Shavian block:

References 

Unicode blocks
Unicode block
Computer-related introductions in 2001